Jennifer Anne Lien (born August 24, 1974) is an American former actress known for playing the alien Kes on the television series Star Trek: Voyager.

Early life 
Lien was born August 24, 1974, in Illinois, the youngest of three children, and joined the Illinois Theatre Center at the age of 13.

In a 1992 interview, Lien said: "My childhood was wild because I was very uncomfortable living where I lived (the South Side of Chicago). It was very industrial – if you didn’t fit in you got your ass kicked. I was just my own person, and I adopted this really tough skin because I had to if I wanted to survive. A lot of my friends were into drugs, and I saw a lot of them die." In a 1993 interview, Lien said:

Career 
Lien's first television appearance was in a bubble gum commercial playing twins. Her first appearance on a television series was as a music academy student in a 1990 episode of Brewster Place, starring Oprah Winfrey. The same year she provided her voice for the dubbed English language version of Baby Blood, a French horror film. Lien moved to New York in 1991 after she was cast as Hannah Moore on the soap opera Another World. She attended and graduated from the Professional Children's School while working on this series.

In a 1992 interview, Lien said: "A couple of years ago, I was trying to get an audition for a baseball movie, so I said that I could play baseball. We'd always played a lot while I was growing up, like in the backyard. But when I showed up at the audition, I was faced with these Goliath-like, testosterone women who could really play. I did survive the two days of training and auditions, but I basically pulled every muscle in my body!"

In 1993, Lien was cast as Roanne in Phenom, a sitcom starring Judith Light. She also participated in the recording of Adam Sandler's comedy album They're All Gonna Laugh At You in which she played the part of the Valedictorian on the track "The Buffoon And The Valedictorian", as well as one of the daughters on the track "Oh, mom..."

In 1994, Lien was cast as Kes on Star Trek: Voyager. Her character is an Ocampan, a species in the Star Trek universe that lives for only eight to nine years, who joins the starship's crew after it is stranded 70,000 light-years from Earth.

In the same year, Lien voiced the character Valerie Fox in the pilot episode of The Critic.

Richard Lutz wrote, "The medical personnel in Star Trek best embody the humane values embedded in this franchise; the most notable of which is Kes, thanks in large part to Jennifer Lien whose remarkable performance brought to life a beautiful child-like being (Ocampa) whose short lifespan and humanity reminds us that the most important element in a life worth living is a loving connection with our fellow human beings."

The showrunners reluctantly terminated Lien's contract as a member of Voyager's main cast due to unresolved personal issues that negatively impacted her performances. She was replaced by a new character, Seven of Nine, played by Jeri Ryan. In 2000, Lien returned as a guest actor for a season six episode titled "Fury".

After Voyager, Lien appeared in the movie American History X as Edward Norton's younger sister. In 1998, she appeared in SLC Punk! playing Sandy, the wild girlfriend of Matthew Lillard's character. She also voiced Agent "L" for the first three seasons of Men in Black: The Animated Series (1997–1999) and the first seven episodes of the 2000 season.

Conventions 
Lien has attended science fiction conventions in relation to her role as Kes when she was working on Voyager and after her film career ended.

Personal life 
Lien is married to writer and filmmaker Phil Hwang; their son, Jonah, was born on September 5, 2002. Upon his birth, Lien retired from acting and voice-over work but was credited as executive producer on her husband's 2008 film Geek Mythology. In August 2010, Lien said she intended to work as a nutritionist after completing her studies.

In a 2000 interview, Lien said that she liked every kind of music, and that she played the trombone, which she started in high school. She said she supported charities helping people with AIDS and had worked with Camp 40, of which she said: "I want to be doing what I can for people who need it."

Between 2015 and 2018, Lien was arrested and charged with a variety of offenses, several of which were later dropped. The court eventually ordered her to undergo mental health treatment.

Filmography

Film

Television

References

External links
 
 
 

Actresses from Illinois
American child actresses
American film actresses
American stage actresses
American television actresses
American voice actresses
Living people
People from Palos Heights, Illinois
1974 births
20th-century American actresses
21st-century American actresses